The 1947 Dayton Flyers football team was an American football team that represented the University of Dayton as an independent during the 1947 college football season. In its first season under head coach Joe Gavin, the team compiled a 6–3 record and outscored opponents by a total of 163 to 103. Dick Dahn was the team captain.

Schedule

References

Dayton
Dayton Flyers football seasons
Dayton Flyers football